"Telecastic fake show" is a single by Japanese rock band Ling tosite Sigure. It was released as both a CD and a CD/DVD combo. The single reached No. 17 on the Oricon charts, despite the fact that they belonged to an independent record label.

Track listing
All tracks written and composed by Toru "TK" Kitajima.

References

External links 
 Ling tosite sigure discography 

2008 singles
2008 songs